Pavel Kurakin (born 3 December 1966 in Kolchugino) is a former Russian football player.

References

1966 births
People from Vladimir Oblast
Living people
Soviet footballers
FC KAMAZ Naberezhnye Chelny players
Russian footballers
Russian Premier League players
Association football defenders
FC Nosta Novotroitsk players
Sportspeople from Vladimir Oblast